The Shabakty is a river in southern Kazakhstan.
 
The river flows across Sarysu District of the Zhambyl Region. There are two inhabited places by the riverbank, Saudakent near the mouth and Aktogay in the upper course. The water of the river is used by local households and for irrigating crops.

Course
The Shabakty river has its origin in a spring of the northern slopes of the Karatau Range. It heads roughly northwestwards down a canyon with steep sides. The bottom of the river channel is pebbly and the water is fresh and clean. In its final stretch its valley widens and the river bends and flows roughly northwards, parallel to the Ushbas river to the west. Finally the Shabakty ends up in the southeastern shore of Akzhar lake. The river is fed mainly by rain, snow and groundwater. In the summer, when the riverbed dries, the river doesn't reach the salt lake cluster.

See also
List of rivers of Kazakhstan

References

External links
Географическая точка Каньон Шабакты 

Rivers of Kazakhstan
Jambyl Region
Endorheic basins of Asia
kk:Шабақты